The 1968 United States presidential election in Rhode Island took place on November 5, 1968, as part of the 1968 United States presidential election. Voters chose four representatives, or electors, to the Electoral College, who voted for president and vice president.

Rhode Island was won by the Democratic candidate, Vice President Hubert Humphrey, with 64.03% of the popular vote, against the Republican candidate, former Senator and Vice President Richard Nixon, with 31.78% of the popular vote. American Independent Party candidate George Wallace also appeared on the ballot, finishing with 4.07% of the popular vote. Despite the state trending 30 points Republican after setting a record in 1964 since then as of 2020, the state continued to overwhelmingly vote for the Democratic candidate in 1968.

Results

By county

See also
 United States presidential elections in Rhode Island

Notes

References

Rhode Island
1968
1968 Rhode Island elections